Pseudolarix amabilis is a species of coniferous tree in the pine family Pinaceae. The species is commonly known as golden larch, but being more closely related to Keteleeria, Abies and Cedrus, is not a true larch (Larix). The earliest known occurrences are of compression fossils found in the Ypresian Allenby Formation and mummified fossils found in the Late Eocene Buchanan Lake Formation on Axel Heiberg Island.

Growth
The shoots are dimorphic, with long shoots and short shoots similar to a larch, though the short shoots are not so markedly short, lengthening about 5 mm annually. The leaves are bright green, 3–6 cm long and 2–3 mm broad, with two glaucous stomatal bands on the underside; they turn a brilliant golden yellow before falling in the autumn, hence the common name "golden larch". The leaves are arranged spirally, widely spaced on long shoots, and in a dense whorl on the short shoots.

The cones are distinctive, superficially resembling small globe artichokes, 4–7 cm long and 4–6 cm broad, with pointed triangular scales; they mature about 7 months after pollination, when (like fir and cedar cones) they disintegrate to release the winged seeds. The male cones, as in Keteleeria, are produced in umbels of several together in one bud.

Characteristics
The golden larch is an attractive ornamental tree for parks and large garden. Unlike the true larches, it is tolerant of summer heat and humidity, growing successfully in the southeastern United States where most larches and firs do not succeed. In Europe growth is most successful in the Mediterranean region with notable specimens in northern Italy; further north in the United Kingdom it will grow, but only very slowly due to the cooler summers.

This plant has gained the Royal Horticultural Society's Award of Garden Merit.

Gallery

References

External links

Pseudolarix amabilis images at the Arnold Arboretum of Harvard University Plant Image Database
Friedman, William (Ned). "Golden larches never disappoint." Posts from the Collection, Arnold Arboretum of Harvard University website, 18 November 2019. Accessed 13 May 2020.
Rose, Nancy. "Not All Conifers are Evergreen." Arnold Arboretum of Harvard University website, 6 January 2016. Accessed 13 May 2020.
Friedman, William (Ned). "Leaf shadows on Peter Hill." Posts from the Collection, Arnold Arboretum of Harvard University website, 18 November 2019. Accessed 13 May 2020.
Arboretum de Villardebelle - photos of cones
Gymnosperm Database
Pseudolarix in the Flora of China
Article in Harvard University Bulletin of Popular Information (1919)

Pinaceae
Endemic flora of China
Trees of China
Medicinal plants of Asia
Plants used in traditional Chinese medicine
Extant Eocene first appearances
Endangered flora of Asia
Deciduous conifers
Buchanan Lake Formation
Allenby Formation